Euphorbia peplus (petty spurge, radium weed, cancer weed, or milkweed), is a species of Euphorbia, native to most of Europe, northern Africa and western Asia, where it typically grows in cultivated arable land, gardens and other disturbed land.

Outside of its native range it is very widely naturalised and often invasive, including in Australia, New Zealand, North America and other countries in temperate and sub-tropical regions.

Description 
It has green flowers in three-rayed umbels. The glands, typical of the Euphorbiaceae, are kidney-shaped with long thin horns.

Medicinal uses 
The plant's sap is toxic to rapidly replicating human tissue, and has long been used as a traditional remedy for common skin lesions. The active ingredient in the sap is a diterpene ester called ingenol mebutate.

A pharmaceutical-grade ingenol mebutate gel has approval from the US Food and Drug Administration for treatment of actinic keratosis.

In Germany, recent studies have linked Euphorbia peplus with the virtual elimination of squamous cell skin cancer.

References

External links
 

peplus
Flora of Africa
Flora of Asia
Flora of Europe
Flora of Lebanon
Medicinal plants of Africa
Medicinal plants of Asia
Medicinal plants of Europe
Plants described in 1753
Taxa named by Carl Linnaeus
Poisonous plants